The 2020 AFC U-19 Championship qualification was an international men's under-19 football competition which was originally held to decide the participating teams of the 2020 AFC U-19 Championship. The AFC announced the cancellation of the final tournament due to the COVID-19 pandemic on 25 January 2021.

Draw
Of the 47 AFC member associations, 46 teams entered the competition.

The draw was held on 9 May 2019 at the AFC House in Kuala Lumpur, Malaysia.

West: 25 teams from West Asia, Central Asia and South Asia, to be drawn into six groups: one group of five teams and five groups of four teams (Groups A–F).
East: 21 teams from ASEAN and East Asia, to be drawn into five groups: one group of five teams and four groups of four teams (Groups G–K).

The teams were seeded in each zone according to their performance in the 2018 AFC U-19 Championship final tournament and qualification (overall ranking shown in parentheses; NR stands for non-ranked teams). The following restrictions were also applied:
The eleven teams which indicated their intention to serve as qualification group hosts prior to the draw were drawn into separate groups.

Notes
Teams in bold qualified for the final tournament.
(H): Qualification group hosts (* Oman replaced Iraq as group hosts after the draw)
(Q): Final tournament hosts, automatically qualified regardless of qualification results

Player eligibility
Players born on or after 1 January 2001 were eligible to compete in the tournament.

Format
In each group, teams played each other once at a centralised venue. The eleven group winners and the four best runners-up qualified for the final tournament. As Uzbekistan (who were the designated final tournament hosts) were among the four best runners-up, the fifth best runner-up also qualified for the final tournament.

Tiebreakers
Teams were ranked according to points (3 points for a win, 1 point for a draw, 0 points for a loss), and if tied on points, the following tiebreaking criteria are applied, in the order given, to determine the rankings (Regulations Article 9.3):
Points in head-to-head matches among tied teams;
Goal difference in head-to-head matches among tied teams;
Goals scored in head-to-head matches among tied teams;
If more than two teams are tied, and after applying all head-to-head criteria above, a subset of teams are still tied, all head-to-head criteria above are reapplied exclusively to this subset of teams;
Goal difference in all group matches;
Goals scored in all group matches;
Penalty shoot-out if only two teams are tied and they met in the last round of the group;
Disciplinary points (yellow card = 1 point, red card as a result of two yellow cards = 3 points, direct red card = 3 points, yellow card followed by direct red card = 4 points);
Drawing of lots.

Groups

Group A
All matches were held in Oman.
Times listed are UTC+4.
Iraq was initially announced as the hosts of the group, with the matches scheduled to be played between 2–10 November. Following the 2019 Iraqi protests, matches were postponed to a later time and venue, which was subsequently confirmed to be between 22 and 30 November 2019 in Oman.

Group B
All matches were held in Qatar.
Times listed are UTC+3.

Group C
All matches were held in Tajikistan.
Times listed are UTC+5.

Group D
All matches were held in Iran.
Times listed are UTC+3:30.

Group E
All matches were held in Bahrain.
Times listed are UTC+3.

Group F
All matches were held in Saudi Arabia.
Times listed are UTC+3.

Group G
All matches were held in Cambodia.
Times listed are UTC+7.

Group H
All matches were held in Chinese Taipei.
Times listed are UTC+8.

Group I
All matches were held in Myanmar.
Times listed are UTC+6:30.

Group J
All matches were held in Vietnam.
Times listed are UTC+7.

Group K
All matches were held in Indonesia.
Times listed are UTC+7.

Ranking of second-placed teams
Due to groups having a different number of teams, the results against the fifth-placed teams in five-team groups were not considered for this ranking. Uzbekistan had already qualified as hosts of the final tournament.

Qualified teams
The following 16 teams qualified for the final tournament.

1 Bold indicates champions for that year. Italic indicates hosts for that year.
2 As South Vietnam

Goalscorers

References

External links
, the-AFC.com
AFC U-19 Championship 2020, stats.the-AFC.com

Qualification
2020
U-19 Championship qualification
2019 in youth association football
October 2019 sports events in Asia
November 2019 sports events in Asia